Stadion Veruda is a multi-use stadium in Pula, Croatia. It is second stadium in Pula. It served as home stadium for football club NK Istra 1961 until 2011 and completed renovation of Stadion Aldo Drosina. The stadium all seating capacity is 2,500.

References

SRC VERUDA Osobna iskaznica 

Veruda
Buildings and structures in Pula
Sport in Pula